"Come to Me" is a song recorded by American alternative rock band the Goo Goo Dolls from their tenth studio album Magnetic. "Come to Me" premiered on US radio stations starting July 23, 2013 and was officially released the same day.

Track listing
 Digital download
"Come to Me" – 3:45

Chart performance

Weekly charts

Year-end charts

Certifications

References

2013 singles
Goo Goo Dolls songs
Songs written by John Rzeznik
2013 songs
Songs written by Gregg Wattenberg
Warner Records singles
Songs about marriage